The Bleeding Wolf is a Grade II listed public house at 121 Congleton Road North, Scholar Green, Cheshire ST7 3BQ. The unusual name is said to arise from a legend in which King John rewards a local forester for saving him from a wolf.

It is on the Campaign for Real Ale's National Inventory of Historic Pub Interiors.

The pub was designed in vernacular revival style and was built in 1936 for Robinson's Brewery of Stockport, replacing an earlier pub on the site. It was provided with a car park.

See also
Listed buildings in Odd Rode

References

External links

National Inventory Pubs
Grade II listed pubs in Cheshire
Thatched buildings in England
1934 establishments in England